"Tuesday I'll Be Gone" is a song by American singer John Anderson for his twenty-second studio album, Years (2020). It features guest vocals from American singer Blake Shelton. Anderson co-wrote the song with Dan Auerbach and David Ferguson, the sole producer. It was released as the album's second single on February 7, 2020, though Auerbach's Easy Eye Sound record label.

Composition and lyrics 
Stephen L. Betts from Rolling Stone described "Tuesday I'll Be Gone" as a "plaintive yet forward-looking" country song with lyrics that discuss the uncertainty of life. Taste of Countrys Sterling Whitaker called it a musical departure from Anderson's "traditional country" roots, noting that it sounds more like an "early country rock" song suited for the American band Eagles.

Track listings

Release history

References 

2020 singles
2020 songs
Blake Shelton songs
John Anderson (musician) songs
Songs written by John Anderson (musician)
Songs written by Dan Auerbach